Starina is a village and municipality in Stará Ľubovňa District in the Prešov Region of northern Slovakia.

History
In historical records the village was first mentioned in 1352.

Geography
The municipality lies at an altitude of 477 metres and covers an area of 9.088 km2. It has a population of about 70 people.

External links
Starina - The Carpathian Connection
http://www.statistics.sk/mosmis/eng/run.html

Villages and municipalities in Stará Ľubovňa District
Šariš